Mardenis is an unincorporated community in Union Township, Huntington County, Indiana, US.

History
Mardenis was named for William Mardenis, a railroad agent. A post office was established at Mardenis in 1884, and remained in operation until it was discontinued in 1904.

Geography

References

Unincorporated communities in Huntington County, Indiana
Unincorporated communities in Indiana